Twin Lakes Township may refer to:

Twin Lakes Township, Calhoun County, Iowa
Twin Lakes Township, Carlton County, Minnesota
Twin Lakes Township, Mahnomen County, Minnesota

See also

Twin Lakes (disambiguation)
Twin Lake Township (disambiguation)

Township name disambiguation pages